Akropolis is the largest shopping mall in the Baltics by floor area, a shopping center and entertainment center in Vilnius, the Lithuanian capital. It was built in Šeškinė by Akropolis Group in 2002 and opened in April 2002 (at that time the area was 54,000 square meters). The bank "Hansa-LTB" financed the construction. The authors of the project "Akropolis" were  architects Gediminas Jurevičius and Algimantas Nasvytis from Vilnius. Interior project author was designer Unko Kunnap (Estonia).

There is a free car park next to the building. In Akropolis there are grocery stores, Maxima LT supermarket, shops etc. The shopping center also has a bookstore. The area has an area of 110,000 square meters. Not far away is the other shopping center, PC Ozas, built by German companies.

See also 
 List of shopping malls in Lithuania

External links 

 Akropolis (lt, en)

References

Shopping malls in Vilnius
Commercial buildings completed in 2002
Šeškinė
2002 establishments in Lithuania